Francis Kouassi Koné (born 20 November 1990) is a professional footballer who plays as a forward for Malaysia Super League club Kedah Darul Aman.

He is cap-tied to Togo, where his mother was born.

Club career

Slovácko
In February 2017, during a match against Bohemians 1905, Koné saved the life of opposing goalkeeper Martin Berkovec by preventing him from swallowing his tongue after he was knocked unconscious. Koné was labelled a hero and in an interview after the match revealed that it was the fourth time he saved a player's life by pulling out their tongue. For his act, he was awarded the 2017 FIFA Fair Play Award.

Kuala Lumpur City F.C.
In January 2020, Kone signed for Kuala Lumpur City. The club was recently relegated from the top division and was looking to strengthen the team forward line. Kone scored on his debut for  Kuala Lumpur FA in the 89th minutes, giving Kuala Lumpur a valuable point. He scored two more goals in the next 3 matches before the COVID-19 pandemic forced the league to be suspended. Despite the reduced number of games played due to the pandemic, he still managed to become the team's top goal scorer by the end of the season.

References

External links 
 
 
 Francis Koné 1. FC Slovácko profile

1990 births
Living people
Ivorian footballers
Togolese footballers
Association football forwards
Primeira Liga players
Nemzeti Bajnokság I players
Czech First League players
Al-Musannah SC players
S.C. Olhanense players
Budapest Honvéd FC II players
Budapest Honvéd FC players
1. FC Slovácko players
FC Zbrojovka Brno players
Negeri Sembilan FC players
Togo international footballers
Ivorian expatriate footballers
Togolese expatriate footballers
Ivorian expatriate sportspeople in Oman
Togolese expatriate sportspeople in Oman
Expatriate footballers in Oman
Ivorian expatriate sportspeople in Portugal
Expatriate footballers in Portugal
Ivorian expatriate sportspeople in Hungary
Togolese expatriate sportspeople in Hungary
Expatriate footballers in Hungary
Ivorian expatriate sportspeople in the Czech Republic
Expatriate footballers in the Czech Republic
21st-century Togolese people
People from Bondoukou